The Golden Gloves Story is a 1950 American film noir sports film directed by Felix E. Feist. It tells the story of boxer Nick Martel as he competes in the Golden Gloves tournament. During the competition he falls in love with Patti, the daughter of Joe Riley, a boxing referee.

Plot

Cast
James Dunn as Joe Riley 
Dewey Martin as Nick Martel 
Gregg Sherwood as Iris Anthony 
Kevin O'Morrison as Bob Gilmore 
Kay Westfall as Patti Riley
Fern Persons as Mrs. Burke

References

External links
The Golden Gloves Story at IMDb

1950 films
Films directed by Felix E. Feist
Eagle-Lion Films films
1950 drama films
American drama films
Films scored by Arthur Lange
American black-and-white films
1950s English-language films
1950s American films